Cardinal McKeefry School, originally Marist Brothers' Thorndon, is a Catholic primary and intermediate school for girls and boys catering from Year 1 to Year 8 (5 to 13 years old). The school traces its origins to the Marist Brothers' first school opened in New Zealand in 1876. The current school was opened in 1970 by Cardinal Peter McKeefry and named after him.

Location
Cardinal McKeefry is located in Wellington New Zealand, in the city's western suburbs. It is a 9-minute drive from the Wellington CBD, and close to the suburbs of Karori, Kelburn, Northland, Wilton, Wadestown and Ngaio. Students from further afield also attend.

History
The school is the successor of the first New Zealand Marist Brothers' School which commenced in Boulcott Street in 1876. That school was relocated to Hawkestone Street in 1911 and as Marist Thorndon offered education for boys from Year 4 – Year 8 (i.e. generally boys aged from 9 to 12). The school shifted in stages to its present site when the Hawkestone St site was taken under the Public Works Act 1928 for the Wellington Urban Motorway. The present school was opened in 1970 by Cardinal McKeefry and was named after him. In August 1978, Bishop Owen Snedden, Auxiliary Bishop of Wellington (acting in the interregnum following Cardinal McKeefry's death and before the appointment of his successor, Thomas Williams) signed the integration agreement for Cardinal McKeefry Catholic Primary School and, with St Bernard's School, Brooklyn, it became one of the first two schools to be integrated into the State education system under the Private Schools Conditional Integration Act 1975. The school ceased to be a boys-only, years 4 to 8 school and became a State-Integrated, full primary, co-educational, school.

School activities
Students take part in a range of activities within the school, Wellington City and further afield.  These include singing and choral festivals, arts and technology classes, cultural activities and regional sporting events.  Regular educational trips and visits take place to venues such as the Museum of New Zealand 'Te Papa' in downtown Wellington, and the nearby Karori Wildlife Sanctuary.

School size, character and facilities
Roll size for the school was 85 students in 2018.

The school charter includes 'Catholic character' which involves curriculum covering spirituality, concepts of inclusiveness and respect for diversity.    
    
An after school care service operates.  Grass playing fields and hard surface outdoor spaces are present on-site. Children walk or catch a bus to and from school, and a drop off area is within the school grounds for those arriving by car.

References

1876 establishments in New Zealand
1970 establishments in New Zealand
Educational institutions established in 1970
Intermediate schools in New Zealand
Schools in Wellington City
Roman Catholic schools in the Wellington Region
Catholic primary schools in New Zealand